The Magic Christmas Tree is a 1964 American Christmas-themed fantasy-adventure film about a boy who uses a magic ring to bring a Christmas tree to life. The tree then grants the boy three wishes.

Plot

Three boys are walking home from school on the afternoon of Halloween. On the way home, one boy, Mark, agrees to help a strange old woman to get her cat, Lucifer, out of a tree. Mark climbs the tree, but falls and is knocked unconscious. When Mark wakes up, he discovers that the old woman is really a witch. The witch gives Mark a magic ring, and tells him that if he plants the seeds inside a magic tree will grow. On Thanksgiving, Mark performs the magic spell that the witch taught him, and a magic evergreen tree grows overnight in the back yard. Mark's father tries to cut down the tree, but to no avail. Later, on Christmas Eve, the Magic Tree comes to life, and grants Mark three wishes. The boy first wishes for one hour of absolute power, which he promptly abuses. Mark's second wish is to have Santa Claus all to himself. When Mark sees the unhappiness his selfishness causes after seeing a giant, however, he uses his third wish to return Santa Claus to the children of the world on Christmas Day. Mark wakes up, and realizes that the entire adventure was all a dream...or was it?

Production

In the style of The Wizard of Oz, The Magic Christmas Tree presents a full-color dream sequence bracketed by black-and-white 'reality' sequences. It was filmed in La Verne, California on an extremely low budget.

Home video

The Magic Christmas Tree was released on VHS by Goodtimes in 1992. It has been marketed in a two-pack with the Mexican film Santa Claus. In 2011, the film was parodied by Mike Nelson, Kevin Murphy and Bill Corbett of RiffTrax.

See also
 List of Christmas films
 Santa Claus in film

External links
 
Original theatrical trailer
Cinema Snob's take on the 1964 film
Available for free on Internet Archive
The Magic Christmas Tree on Tubi

References

1964 films
1960s fantasy adventure films
Santa Claus in film
American Christmas films
American fantasy adventure films
American independent films
Films about witchcraft
1964 independent films
1960s rediscovered films
American films about Halloween
Rediscovered American films
1960s English-language films
1960s American films